Albert David Hedison Jr. (May 20, 1927 – July 18, 2019) was an American film, television, and stage actor. He was billed as Al Hedison in his early film work until 1959 when he was cast in the role of Victor Sebastian in the short-lived espionage television series Five Fingers. NBC insisted that he change his name and he proposed his middle name; he was billed as David Hedison from then on. He was known for his roles as the titular character in The Fly (1958), Captain Lee Crane in the television science fiction drama Voyage to the Bottom of the Sea (1964–1968), and CIA agent Felix Leiter in two James Bond films, Live and Let Die (1973) and Licence to Kill (1989).

Biography

Early life
He was born in Providence, Rhode Island to Albert David Hedison (Heditsian) Sr. and Rose Boghosian; both of whom were Armenian. Hedison decided he wanted to be an actor after he saw Tyrone Power in the film Blood and Sand.

He began his acting career with the Sock and Buskin Players at Brown University before moving to New York to study with Sanford Meisner and Martha Graham at the Neighborhood Playhouse School of the Theatre and with Lee Strasberg at the Actors Studio.

Theatre
He acted at Newport Casino Theatre. In 1951 he won a Barter Theatre Award for most promising young actor, entitling him to work at a theatre in Virginia. He did radio in North Carolina and worked on stage in Pittsburgh.

His work on the New York stage included an appearance in Much Ado About Nothing (1952). He was studying with Uta Hagen who recommended him for a role in the Broadway production of A Month in the Country (1956), directed by Michael Redgrave. It ran for 48 performances on Broadway. The Theatre World declared Hedison as one of the most promising theatre personalities of the 1955–56 season.

20th Century Fox
After his role in A Month in the Country, Hedison signed a film contract with 20th Century Fox in May 1957. His first movie with them was the classic war film The Enemy Below (1957), which also starred Robert Mitchum.

He followed that up with the lead role in the horror film The Fly (1958) with Vincent Price as his brother. Hedison got the role after Rick Jason turned it down. The film was very successful at the box office.

Hedison went to England to play the lead role in The Son of Robin Hood (1958).

Television
Hedison was cast in the lead of a TV series made by Fox for NBC, Five Fingers (1959). He was reluctant to make it, especially when NBC insisted he change his first name (Al) to David (which was his middle name). The series lasted only one season.

Hedison had the lead role in an adventure film The Lost World (1960), directed by Irwin Allen. 

Hedison guest starred on some Fox shows, Hong Kong and Bus Stop. He co-starred with Tom Tryon in Marines, Let's Go (1961).

Hedison worked regularly on television, guest starring in Perry Mason, Wonder Woman and The Farmer's Daughter. He co-starred in an episode of The Saint, starring Roger Moore who became a great friend. The episode's plot prophetically involves Moore's Saint mistaken for 007 and Hedison as an FBI agent — roles they would play seven years later as 007 and Felix Leiter in Live and Let Die. He was one of many stars in the film The Greatest Story Ever Told (1965). 

After turning down the role of Captain Crane in the film version of Irwin Allen's Voyage to the Bottom of the Sea, Allen again offered the same role to him in the television series of the same name, co-starring with Richard Basehart, which ran from 1964 to 1968.

After Voyage to the Bottom of the Sea concluded, Hedison was offered the role of Mike Brady on The Brady Bunch, but turned it down, stating, "after four years of subs and monsters, who needs kids and dogs?" The role eventually went to Robert Reed.

Hedison moved to London. "I liked London very much," he later said. "I just wanted to go and spend a couple years there ... It's two years I'm not sorry for. The problem was, when I came back to the US, it was more difficult getting work then."

Hedison guest starred on Journey to the Unknown; Love, American Style; ITV Sunday Night Theatre; the BBC's Play of the Month; The F.B.I.; and The New Perry Mason. He could be seen in Kemek (1970), A Kiss Is Just a Kiss (1971), Crime Club (1973), The Cat Creature, and The Man in the Wood. He was most proud of doing an adaptation of Summer and Smoke with Lee Remick.

James Bond appearances
Hedison played Felix Leiter in Live and Let Die (1973), with his friend Roger Moore starring as the new James Bond. Bond scholars Pfeiffer and Worrall praised the friendship between Leiter and Bond for being depicted with "genuine chemistry" between the two.

Sixteen years later, Hedison returned to play Leiter in Licence to Kill (1989), with Bond now being portrayed by Timothy Dalton. Hedison became the first actor to reprise the role of Felix Leiter and is the only actor to play Leiter with two different James Bonds.

Hedison thought he was asked back because "there was much more to do in the film than in the past, and they were afraid of using an unknown or someone they were not quite sure of." "I think in this kind of film, it won't lead to other work unless you do something stand-out with a really wonderfully written scene," added Hedison. "Otherwise you're just doing a job, part of the ensemble. And in this case, I have lots of action scenes, but no one scene that is memorable ... Felix is a fairly one-dimensional character, you never get into any depth. You do what you can. There's not much to play. All you can do is perform it with a simple reality ... It was running around, bang bang, getting wet, screaming and yelling, and all kinds of fun, but not serious acting."

1980s
Hedison toured with Barbara Anderson and Anita Gillette in Neil Simon's Chapter Two in 1979 and 1980.

He could be seen in North Sea Hijack (1980), episodes of Charlie's Angels, Nero Wolfe, Hart to Hart, T. J. Hooker, Matt Houston, Amanda's, Dynasty, Fantasy Island, Partners in Crime, The Fall Guy, The Love Boat, Simon & Simon, Double Trouble, Finder of Lost Loves, Knight Rider, Crazy Like a Fox, The A-Team, Trapper John, M.D., Hotel, The Colbys, Who's the Boss?, The Law & Harry McGraw, and Murder, She Wrote.

He was in The Awakening of Cassie for Romance Theatre, Kenny Rogers as The Gambler: The Adventure Continues and The Naked Face (1984) with Moore.

Hedison appeared in the West Coast premiere of Forty Deuce in 1985.

Later career

From 1991 to 1996, Hedison was a regular on the long-running soap opera Another World.

He also starred in the New York City premiere of First Love with Lois Nettleton in 1999. He returned to the Cape Playhouse to appear in Tale of the Allergist's Wife (2002), and at Monmouth University's Pollak Theatre, in Love Letters with Nancy Dussault in 2007.

He had a role in The Young and the Restless and could be seen in The Reality Trap (2005).

In 2006, he acted in The Scent of Jasmine at the Fountain Theatre in Los Angeles on November 13. In 2008, Hedison performed Uncle Vanya at the Actors Studio West. He also participated in performances of The Cherry Orchard and I Never Sang for My Father in Los Angeles in 2009. He later appeared in The Marriage Play by Edward Albee.

He was in Superman and the Secret Planet and Confessions of a Teenage Jesus Jerk.

Personal life
He and his wife Bridget were married in London on June 29, 1968. Bridget Hedison died of breast cancer on February 22, 2016. They had two daughters, actor/director/photographer Alexandra Hedison and editor/producer Serena Hedison. Alexandra Hedison has appeared in L.A. Firefighters and The L Word and is married to actress and director Jodie Foster.

He died on July 18, 2019, at his home in Los Angeles.

Filmography

Film

Television

References

External links

 
 
 
 
 
 Hedison on the Felix Leiter website
 Interview with David Hedison at Classic Film & TV Cafe
 Bridget Hedison obituary
 Mi6.co.uk Interviews David Hedison

|-

1927 births
2019 deaths
20th-century American male actors
21st-century American male actors
20th Century Studios contract players
Actors from Providence, Rhode Island
Writers from Providence, Rhode Island
Military personnel from Rhode Island
American male film actors
American male Shakespearean actors
American male soap opera actors
American male stage actors
American male television actors
American people of Armenian descent
Actors Studio alumni
Brown University alumni
Neighborhood Playhouse School of the Theatre alumni
United States Navy sailors